Abbigeri may refer to several places in India:

 Abbigeri, Koppal
 Abbigeri, Gadag